Victor Westermarck (born 26 February 1994) is a Finnish professional ice hockey defenceman currently playing for the Espoo Blues in the Liiga.

Playing career
Westermarck played in the Espoo Blues organisation at the U16, U18 and U20 levels before moving to Tappara in 2013 and playing in their U20 program for the 2013–14 season. During the 2013–14 season Westermarck was also loaned to Leki and played 7 games in the Mestis.

For the 2014–15 season Westermarck was back with the Blues and played most of the season in the Liiga with a temporary loan to Kiekko-Vantaa of the Mestis.

Career statistics

External links

1994 births
Espoo Blues players
Finnish ice hockey defencemen
Living people
Espoo United players
Kiekko-Vantaa players
Lempäälän Kisa players
Vaasan Sport players